Ratna Bahadur Rai is an Indian politician. He was elected to the Lok Sabha, lower house of the Parliament of India from Darjeeling, West Bengal as a member of the Communist Party of India (Marxist).

References

External links
  Official Biographical Sketch in Lok Sabha Website

Communist Party of India (Marxist) politicians
India MPs 1996–1997
Lok Sabha members from West Bengal
Rajya Sabha members from West Bengal
1948 births
Living people
People from Darjeeling district
Indian Gorkhas
Rai people